Jasikan District is one of the eight districts in Oti Region, Ghana. Originally created as an ordinary district assembly on 10 March 1989, which was created from the former Jasikan District Council, which it was established by Legislative Instrument (L.I.) 1464, until the western part of the district was split off to create Biakoye District on 29 February 2008, which was established by Legislative Instrument (L.I.) 1901; thus the remaining part has been retained as Jasikan District. The district assembly is located in the southern part of Oti Region and has Jasikan as its capital town.

Boundaries
Jasikan District is bounded by:
 Lake Volta to the west
 Kpando Municipal District and Hohoe Municipal District to the south
 Krachi East District and Kadjebi District to the north

Towns and villages
In addition to Jasikan, the capital and administrative centre, Jasikan District contains the following towns and villages in Buem in alphabetical order.

 Agbesi Madro 
 Agomeyor
 Akpafu Todzi
 Akpafu Adorkor
 Akpafu Mempeasem
 Amenyo Yaw
 Akaa
 Akaa Quarters
 Akaa Tank
 Akaa Yaw
 Atakrom
 Atonkor
 Awoma
 Baglo Buem
 Bodada
 Baglo Odumasi
 Dzoku
 Dzolu
 Guama
 Idjeli
 Kayadah
 Kankyi Ekura
 Kudje
 Kute
 Kwanta 
 Kwansim
 Lekanti
 New Ayoma
 New Baika
 Nsuta
 Nananko
 Okadjakrom
 Old Baika
 Old Ayoma
 Osei Krom
 Teteman

Education 
Jasikan College of Education is one of the College's in Oti Region.

See also

References

External links
 Jasikan District Official website
 GhanaDistricts.com
 Jasikan District on GhanaDistricts.com

Districts of the Oti Region